D class may refer to:

Ships
 D-class cruiser (Germany), a pair of proposed cruisers
 D-class cruiser (United Kingdom), British light cruisers that served during World War II
 D-class lifeboat, British lifeboats
 D-class destroyer (disambiguation), several classes of ships
 British D-class submarine
 United States D-class submarine
 D-class ferry, roll-on/roll-off ferries operated by DFDS Seaways

Rail vehicles

Australia
 MRWA D class, 2-8-0 type steam locomotives
 WAGR D class, 4-6-4T tank locomotive 
 WAGR D class (1884), 0-4-0ST tank locomotives
 WAGR D class (diesel), diesel locomotives
 D-class Melbourne tram
 Sydney D-Class Tram

India
 DHR D Class, 0-4-0+0-4-0 Garratt-type articulated steam locomotives

New Zealand
 NZR D class (1874), 33 2-4-0T tank locomotives
 NZR D class (1929), 1 experimental 0-4-0T locomotives

United Kingdom
 Metropolitan Railway D Class, tank engines
 NBR D class 0-6-0T, tank locomotives
 LNWR Class D, 0-8-0 steam locomotives
 SECR D class, 4-4-0 tender locomotives

Other uses
 D-class blimp, United States Navy blimps
 D-segment, a European vehicle size class
 In the fictional SCP Foundation, expendable people who are sent on dangerous missions.

See also
 Class D (disambiguation)
 D type (disambiguation)